Come Thelma & Louise is the second studio album by Italian singer Giorgia, who won the Sanremo music festival in 1995 with the song Come Saprei (written by herself and Eros Ramazzotti, Adelio Cogliati and Vladi Tosetto), which is also included on the album.

Although Giorgia is listed as the author, many of the tracks on this album were written by Gatto Panceri, including a reinterpretation of the song Non c'è che musica in me, which Giorgia often sang in clubs with her father's band. This album went on to sell more than 400,000 copies.

Background 
Giorgia's second studio album is characterised by lighter lyrics for the most part, but with musical and vocal arrangements worthy of the best voices in the world.
The album contains Come Saprei, a song with which Giorgia won the Sanremo Festival in 1995. Apart from her grand success with this track, the album also had great success with the singles Riguarda Noi, C'è da fare and E c'è ancora mare.
It is noted for its difficult vocals and her cover of I've Got the Music in Me, which in the Italian version became Non c'è che musica in me.

Track listing

Personnel 
 Giorgia – lead vocals, backing vocals
 Alfredo Golino – drums
 Celso Valli – piano, keyboards, Hammond organ
 Paolo Valli – drums, percussion
 Paolo Gianolio – bass, electric guitar, acoustic guitar, programming
 Luca Bignardi – programming
 Emanuela Cortesi, Antonella Pepe, Silvio Pozzoli – backing vocals

Charts

References 

Giorgia (singer) albums
1995 albums